Swargarajyam is a 1962 Indian Malayalam-language film, directed by P. B. Unni and produced by Shanmukha Pictures. The film stars T. R. Omana, T. S. Muthaiah, Ambika and Angamuthu. The film had musical score by M. B. Sreenivasan.

Cast
T. R. Omana 
T. S. Muthaiah 
Ambika 
Angamuthu
GK Pillai 
K. P. Ummer 
Kumari Saraswathi
Kunjandi 
Mary Eddy
Sarasa

Soundtrack
The music was composed by M. B. Sreenivasan and the lyrics were written by P. Bhaskaran.

References

External links
 

1962 films
1960s Malayalam-language films